The 1907 Georgia Tech Yellow Jackets baseball team represented the Georgia Tech Yellow Jackets of the Georgia Institute of Technology in the 1907 IAAUS baseball season. The team featured pitcher Ed Lafitte.

Schedule and results

Notes

References

Georgia Tech Golden Tornado
Georgia Tech Yellow Jackets baseball seasons
Georgia Tech